Diego Alejandro Silva Fuentes (born 11 March 1983) is a Chilean former footballer who played as a defender.

Career
A historical player of Cobresal and Cobreloa, he retired from football after twenty one years as a professional football player at the end of 2022 season.

References

External links

1983 births
Living people
Footballers from Santiago
Chilean footballers
Chilean Primera División players
Tercera División de Chile players
Primera B de Chile
Cobresal footballers
Deportes Santa Cruz footballers
Santiago Morning footballers
Unión San Felipe footballers
Cobreloa footballers
San Luis de Quillota footballers
Segunda División Profesional de Chile players
Deportes Recoleta footballers

Association football defenders